The Gallorette Stakes is a Grade III American Thoroughbred horse race for fillies and mares age three and older over a distance of  miles (8.5 furlongs) on the turf, run annually on Preakness Day at Pimlico Race Course in Baltimore, Maryland. The  event offers a purse of $150,000 added.

History
The race was first carded in its inaugural running in 1952. It became graded for the first time in 1973.

The race is part of a series of stakes races named for famous Marylanders, in this case: Gallorette, one of the great racing fillies in American history. Named for Mrs. M. A. Moore's 1946 and 1947 Champion Handicap Female. Gallorete was famous for beating the males of her day in a number of races. Gallorette also won the 1945 Pimlico Oaks (the sister race to the Preakness Stakes) which was renamed later to the Black-Eyed Susan Stakes. Gallorette's own daughter, Mlle. Lorette, won this race in 1954.

The Gallorette Handicap's stakes record is 1:39.73 held by Miz Money who won the race in 2016.

The Gallorette was run on dirt between 1952-through-1972, in 1979 and 1980, 1984, 1986 and 1987 as well as 1995 and 1996.

Records 
Speed record: 
  miles – 1:40.32 – Precious Kitten (2007)
  miles – 1:50.20 – Mlle. Lorette   (1954)

Most wins by a horse:
 2 – Searching (1955 & 1956)
 2 – Gold Digger (1965 & 1966)

Most wins by a jockey:
 3 – Craig Perret (1979, 1983 & 1988)
 3 – Jerry Bailey (1993, 2004 & 2005)
 3 – Edgar Prado (1991, 1992 & 1999)
 4 – Javier Castellano (2006, 2012, 2015, 2016)

Most wins by a trainer:
 4 – Chad Brown (2012, 2013 & 2015, 2022)

Most wins by an owner:
 3 – Ethel D. Jacobs  (1955, 1956 & 1960)

Winners of the Gallorette Stakes since 1952

Notes:
 † Run in divisions in 1976

See also 

 Gallorette Handicap top three finishers
 Preakness Stakes
 Black-Eyed Susan Stakes
 Pimlico Race Course
 List of graded stakes at Pimlico Race Course

References 

 The Gallorette Handicap at Pedigree Query

Graded stakes races in the United States
1952 establishments in Maryland
Turf races in the United States
Pimlico Race Course
Horse races in Maryland
Horse races established in 1952